The Malaysia women's national handball team is the national women's handball team of Malaysia and is controlled by the Malaysia Handball Association. It will make its first appearance at the Asian Games in 2018.

External links
IHF profile

Women's national handball teams